Punjabi International Film Academy Awards also known as PIFAA Awards are presented to honour both artistic and technical excellence of professionals Punjabi Film Industry. The first ever awards function was held in Toronto, Canada in 2012. The awards were organized by Parvasi Media Inc. and Canadian Government. The PIFA Awards consist of 15 categories and recognizes Punjabi films from across the world. Punjabi films from Pakistan are also included in a special category.

History
The awards were vision of Rajinder Saini, President of the Parvasi Entertainment, whose dream was to create high quality awards for Punjabi Cinema just like Bollywood awards functions. Dharmendra was the Brand Ambassador for the 2012 PIFA Awards.

Awards Ceremonies
The following is a listing of all Punjabi International Film Academy Awards ceremonies since 2012

Awards

Popular Awards

 Best Film - Jury
 Best Film - Public Choice
 Best Director
 Best Actor - Male
 Best Actor - Female
 Best Supporting Actor - Male
 Best Supporting Actor - Female
 Best Performance in Negative Role
 Best Performance in Comic Role
 Best Music Director
 Best Lyricist
 Best Story
 Best Playback Singer - Male
 Best Playback Singer - Female
 Best Cinematography
 Best Editor
 Best Dialogue
 Best Screenplay
 Lifetime Achievement Awards

References

External links
 http://www.pifaawards.com/index.php

Award ceremonies
Awards established in 2012
Punjab, India awards